Music and Company was a classical music program that aired from 6:00 am to 9:00 am on weekdays from CBC Radio 2. It was discontinued in September 2008.

The Host
 
Tom Allen was the host of Music and Company since 1998. He is an accomplished trombonist and writer. He hosted the CBC Radio 2 Weekender show for two years (1991-1992) and also hosted the Fresh Air show.

Cage Match
 
Every week Tom Allen hosted a "cage match".  Tom chose two pieces of classical music and had a competition between the two.  The piece with the most votes from listeners won.

External links
 Music and Company

CBC Music programs
Canadian classical music radio programs